The Painestown River is a river in County Kildare, Ireland, a tributary of the Morell River.

Name
The name is derived from the Painestown townland, located in the Kill civil parish.

Course
Painestown River rises in Porterstown, Kilteel. It flows northwestwards, passing under the N7 road at Blackhill. In Painestown it meets two tributaries, the Kill River and the Slane River. The Painestown River continues due north, then passes under the Grand Canal at the Painestown River Aqueduct and passes under the Dublin–Cork railway line in Baronrath. It is then crossed by the Killeenmore Bridge and drains into the Morell River in Turnings Upper, south of Straffan.

See also
Rivers of Ireland

References

River Liffey (system)
Rivers of County Kildare